Everybody Wang Chung Tonight: Wang Chung's Greatest Hits is one of two compilations by Wang Chung.  Released in the spring of 1997, this compilation contains all eight of the band's charted singles from 1984 through 1989.

The album also includes three unreleased songs - "Fun Tonight: The Early Years" is a rough draft of Wang Chung's most popular hit, "Everybody Have Fun Tonight".  "Space Junk (Wang Chung '97)" was made exclusively for this compilation. "Dance Hall Days (Flashing Back to Happiness 7" Mix)" is a version of Wang Chung's first hit.

Track listing
"Dance Hall Days"  – 3:58
"Don't Let Go"  – 4:21
"Don't Be My Enemy"  – 4:24
"Hypnotize Me"  – 4:42
"Let's Go!"  – 4:30
"Praying to a New God"  – 3:56
"What's So Bad About Feeling Good?"  – 4:11
"Wait"  – 4:22
"To Live and Die in L.A."  – 4:52
"Big World"  – 6:12
"Fun Tonight: The Early Years"  – 4:12
"Everybody Have Fun Tonight"  – 4:47
"Space Junk (Wang Chung '97)"  – 4:01
"Dance Hall Days (Flashing Back to Happiness 7" Mix)"  – 3:38

Popular culture
 "Space Junk (Wang Chung '97)" is featured at the end of Season 1, Episode 1 "Days Gone Bye", and Season 9, Episode 5   "What Comes After" on the AMC series, The Walking Dead.

References

1997 greatest hits albums
Wang Chung (band) albums
Geffen Records compilation albums